The 2022 Georgia Bulldogs football team represented the University of Georgia in the 2022 NCAA Division I FBS football season. The Bulldogs played their home games at Sanford Stadium in Athens, Georgia, and competed in the Eastern Division of the Southeastern Conference (SEC). They were led by seventh-year head coach Kirby Smart. They entered the season as the defending consensus national champions.

This season is one of two back-to-back Georgia seasons that won a national championship. In the 2021 season, Georgia won 33-18 against Alabama, and in the 2022 season, Georgia won 65-7 against TCU.

The Bulldogs finished the regular season 12–0, 8–0 in SEC play to finish first in the conference's Eastern Division. In the SEC Championship Game, the Bulldogs defeated the LSU Tigers 50–30 to win their first SEC title since 2017. They advanced to the College Football Playoff for the second straight year and were selected to play against Ohio State in the Peach Bowl. Georgia mounted the largest 4th-quarter comeback in CFP history to defeat Ohio State by a score of 42–41, after Ohio State missed a potential game-winning 50-yard field goal in the final seconds of the game. As the season’s last major team with an undefeated record, the Bulldogs faced off against Texas Christian University (TCU) at SoFi Stadium in Inglewood, California for the 2023 CFP National Championship on January 9, 2023. They dominated TCU 65–7 to become the first team since the 2012 Alabama Crimson Tide to repeat as national champions, along with becoming just the 3rd team to complete a 15–0 season in the modern era, after LSU in 2019 and Clemson in 2018. Their 58-point margin of victory over TCU is the largest of any bowl game result, ever.

Previous season 

The Bulldogs finished the 2021 season with a record of 14–1 (8–0 in the SEC) and as consensus national champions. Georgia entered the season as favorites to win the East Division and meet the Alabama Crimson Tide in the 2021 SEC Championship Game. Georgia finished the regular season with a 12–0 record with four wins against Top 25-ranked teams–and met the Crimson Tide for the SEC Championship. Georgia would lose 24–41. The following day, final College Football Playoff(CFP) standings were unveiled. No. 3 ranked Georgia would meet No. 2 ranked Michigan for the 2021 Orange Bowl, defeating the Wolverines 34–11 to meet No. 1 ranked Alabama for the College Football Playoff National Championship in a rematch of the SEC Championship. In the College Football Playoff National Championship, the Bulldogs defeated the Crimson Tide, 33–18, to capture Georgia's first National Championship since 1980. The victory over Alabama gave Georgia their third national championship in football.

The team finished the 2021 season with a final ranking of No. 1 in both the AP and Coaches' Polls.

Offseason

NFL Draft
 
Fifteen Bulldogs were selected in the 2022 NFL Draft, setting a new record for draft picks from a single school in the seven-round draft era (1994–present).

Players

Outgoing Transfers
Eight players elected to enter the NCAA Transfer Portal during or after the 2021 season.

† Elected to use the extra year of eligibility granted by the NCAA in response to COVID-19.

Additions

Incoming Transfers

Recruiting class

 
  
  
  
  
  
  
  
  
  
  
  
  
 
  
 
  

  
  
  
 
  
  
  
 
  
  
  
  

*= 247Sports Composite rating; ratings are out of 1.00. (five stars= 1.00–.98, four stars= .97–.90, three stars= .80–.89, two stars= .79–.70, no stars= <70)
†= Despite being rated as a four and five star recruit by ESPN, On3.com, Rivals.com and 247Sports.com, TBD received a four-five star 247Sports Composite rating.
Δ= Left the Georgia program following signing but prior to the 2022 season.

Overall class rankings

Returning starters

Offense

Defense

Special teams

† Indicates player was a starter in 2021 but missed all of 2022 due to injury.

Preseason

Spring game

The Bulldogs held spring practices in March and April 2022 with the Georgia football spring game, "G-Day" taking place in Athens, GA on April 16, 2022.

Award watch lists
Listed in the order that they were released

SEC media days
The 2022 SEC Media days will be held in July 2022. The Preseason Polls will be released in July 2022. Each team had their head coach available to talk to the media at the event. Coverage of the event was televised on SEC Network and ESPN.

Preseason All-SEC teams

Media
First Team

Second Team

Third Team

Source:

Coaches

First Team

Second Team

Third Team

Source:

Schedule
Georgia and the SEC announced the 2022 football schedule on September 21, 2021.

Game summaries

vs No. 11 Oregon

vs No. 25 (FCS) Samford

vs South Carolina

vs Kent State

vs Missouri

vs Auburn

vs Vanderbilt

vs Florida

vs No. 1 Tennessee

vs. Mississippi State

vs. Kentucky

vs. Georgia Tech

vs. LSU (SEC Championship)

vs. Ohio State (Peach Bowl–CFP Semifinal)

vs No. 3 TCU (National Championship)

Rankings

Personnel

Coaching staff

 Football Support Staff

Eric Black - Director of Football Creative – Football 
Mike Cavan - Director of Football Administration 
Austin Chambers - Assistant Director of Player Development 
Jay Chapman - Director of Football Management 
David Cooper - Director of recruiting Relations
Anna Courson - Football Operations Assistant 
Chandler Eldridge - Co-Director of Football Creative - Design 
Hunter Parker - Football Operations Assistant 
Bryant Gantt - Director of Player Support and Operations 
Matt Godwin - Player Personnel Coordinator 
Christina Harris - Director of recruiting Administration 
Hailey Hughes - Football Operations Coordinator 
Ann Hunt - Administrative Assistant to Head Coach 
Jonas Jennings - Director of Player Development 
Angela Kirkpatrick - On Campus Recruiting Coordinator 
Jeremy Klawsky - Director of Football Technology 
Collier Madaleno - Director of Football Performance Nutrition 
John Meshad - Director of Equipment Operations 
Chad Morehead - Co-Director of Football Creative Design 
Neyland Raper - Assistant Director of Football Operations & Recruiting 
Logen Reed - Assistant Recruiting Coordinator 
Maurice Sims - Associate Director of Strength & Conditioning
Juwan Taylor - Player Development Assistant
Meaghan Turcotte - Assistant Director of Football Performance Nutrition
Tersoo Uhaa - Assistant Strength & Conditioning Coach
Gage Whitten - Director of Football Equipment and Apparel

Graduate assistants

 Garrett Murphy - Defensive Assistant
 Adam Ray - Special Teams Assistant 
 Jacob Russell - Offensive Assistant
 Rashawn Scott - Offensive assistant

Analysts

 Mike Bobo  –  Offensive Analyst
 Kirk Benedict
 Buster Faulkner
 Davis Merritt
 Rob Muschamp
 Montgomery VanGorder

Roster

Depth chart

True Freshman

Statistics

Team

Individual Leaders

Defense

Key: POS: Position, SOLO: Solo Tackles, AST: Assisted Tackles, TOT: Total Tackles, TFL: Tackles-for-loss, SACK: Quarterback Sacks, INT: Interceptions, BU: Passes Broken Up, PD: Passes Defended, QBH: Quarterback Hits, FR: Fumbles Recovered, FF: Forced Fumbles, BLK: Kicks or Punts Blocked, SAF: Safeties, TD : Touchdown

Special teams

Scoring
Georgia vs Non-Conference Opponents

Georgia vs SEC Opponents

Georgia vs All Opponents

After the season

Awards and SEC honors

All-Americans

All Star game

NFL Draft

The NFL Draft will be held at Arrowhead Stadium in Kansas City, MO on April 27–29, 2023.
 
Bulldogs who were picked in the 2023 NFL Draft:

NFL Draft combine
No members of the 2022 team were invited to participate in drills at the 2023 NFL scouting Combine.
 

† Top performer
 
DNP = Did not participate

References

Georgia
Georgia Bulldogs football seasons
Southeastern Conference football champion seasons
College Football Playoff National Champions
College football undefeated seasons
Georgia Bulldogs football